Nikas Stepanovich Safronov   (born April 8, 1956, Ulyanovsk) is a Soviet and Russian artist. He has been given the title of Honored Artist of the Russian Federation.

 
Nikas Safronov was born in 1956 in Ulyanovsk in a poor family of a retired military man, his family had six children.

He graduated from Moscow State Surikov Academy of Fine Arts. His first exhibition was held in 1978.

A series of psychological portraits of contemporaries brought him great renown.

Nikas calls his painting style Dream Vision.

State and public awards
For his achievements in painting Nikas Safronov was awarded the titles:
 Honored Artist of Russia
 Academician of the Russian Academy of Fine Arts
 Professor of Ulyanovsk State University
 Honorary citizen of Ulyanovsk
 Honorary citizen of Baku

References

External links
 

1956 births
Living people
Russian painters
Russian male painters
People from Ulyanovsk
Full Members of the Russian Academy of Arts
Soviet painters
Russian portrait painters